Siddiqur Rahman (2 October 1951 – 29 June 1986)  was a politician of Barguna District of Bangladesh and former member of parliament for then Patuakhali-2 constituency, which currently is Barguna-1, in 1979. He was a freedom fighter in the 1971 independence war and was one of the leaders of Shambhu Sangram Parishad.

Career 
Student leaders Siddiqur Rahman and Dhirendra Chandra Debnath were among the leaders of Shambhu Sangram Parishad. Under the leadership of the Sangram Parishad, the armed liberation war started in Barguna subdivision and training started in every police station. The youth of Barguna started training with all the students of Chhatra League and Chhatra Union in the field and treasury field of Barguna police station.After 26 March, the Pak army attacked Barguna. Kills innocent people in prisons and brutally tortures women. Similarly, the Pakistani aggressors killed and tortured in other police stations. The freedom-loving youths organized at that time left the city and went into hiding and formed groups of freedom fighters under the leadership of Siddiqur Rahman in different areas. Siddiqur Rahman was elected a member of parliament from undivided Patuakhali-2 as an Awami League (Mizan) candidate in the 1979 Bangladeshi general election.

References 

People from Barguna district
Awami League politicians
2nd Jatiya Sangsad members
1951 births
1986 deaths